Stewart Farquharson (born 27 April 1940) is a British rower. He competed at the 1960 Summer Olympics and the 1964 Summer Olympics. He represented Britain in the inaugural 1962 World Rowing Championships with David Lee Nicholson in the coxless pairs, in which they won the B final.

He also represented England and won a gold medal in the coxless pair with David Lee Nicholson, at the 1962 British Empire and Commonwealth Games in Perth, Western Australia. They both rowed for the University of London Boat Club at the time.

References

1940 births
Living people
British male rowers
Olympic rowers of Great Britain
Rowers at the 1960 Summer Olympics
Rowers at the 1964 Summer Olympics
People from Amersham
Commonwealth Games medallists in rowing
Rowers at the 1962 British Empire and Commonwealth Games
Commonwealth Games gold medallists for England
Medallists at the 1962 British Empire and Commonwealth Games